Falling Into Place is the sixth album by California band Rebelution, released on June 3, 2016. The collection is a joint venture between their 87 Music label and NYC-based Easy Star Records. A dozen years into the group’s stirring career with over 450,000 albums sold independently, the release of this new album finds the  group more energized than ever. Frontman, Eric Rachmany states, “We named the album Falling Into Place  because all of our varied inspirations and experiences came together into one cohesive collection of music that we all really love.” Falling Into Place mingles stories of love gained and lost with reminiscences of years gone by (Pretty Lady, Those Days, Santa Barbara) and socially pertinent songs like Know It All, which challenges the hatred in an ever-more-violent world and a fraught political environment.  Jamaican deejay and one time tour-mate Protoje adds guest vocals on  Inhale  Exhale, an intense earworm celebrating the movement towards further legalization of marijuana.

Following a special performance at the legendary Red Rocks Amphitheater on June 3, Rebelution’s Falling Into Place Summer Tour officially kicked off in New York on June 7, 2016, continuing through August nationwide. The band was joined by their friends The Green + J Boog, Stick Figure, Through The Roots and DJ Mackle on most dates.

Track listing

Charts

References

2016 albums
Rebelution (band) albums